Valverde may refer to:

People
 Valverde (surname)

Places

Dominican Republic
 Valverde Province, a province in the northwest.

Italy
 Valverde, Lombardy, a commune in the Province of Pavia, in the region of Lombardy
 Valverde, Bergamo, a quarter in the city of Bergamo, in the region of Lombardy
 Valverde, Sicily, a commune in the Province of Catania, island of Sicily
 Valverde, Emilia Romagna, a frazione of Cesenatico in the province of Forlì-Cesena

Portugal
 Valverde (Aguiar da Beira), a former civil parish in the municipality of Aguiar da Beira
 Valverde (Alfãndega da Fé), a civil parish in the municipality of Alfândega da Fé
 Valverde (Fundão), a civil parish in the municipality of Fundão
 Valverde (Mirandela), a civil parish in the municipality of Mirandela
 Mogadouro, Valverde, Vale de Porco e Vilar de Rei, a civil parish in the municipality of Mogadouro
 Valverde, Viseu, a village in the municipality of Tondela

Spain
 Valverde del Camino, a municipality in the province of Huelva, Andalusia
 Valverde de Alcalá, a municipality in the Autonomous community of Madrid
 Valverde (Madrid), a ward of Fuencarral-El Pardo district, Madrid
 Valverde de Leganés, a municipality in the province of Badajoz
 Valverde de Mérida, a municipality in the province of Badajoz
 Valverde del Fresno, a municipality in the province of Cáceres
 Valverde de Júcar, a municipality in the province of Cuenca
 Valverde, Aragon, a village in the municipality of Calamocha, Province of Teruel
 Valverde, La Rioja, a village in the municipality of Cervera del Río Alhama, Province of La Rioja, Spain
 Valverde, Santa Cruz de Tenerife, a municipality on the island of El Hierro, Canary Islands
 Valverde-Enrique, a municipality in the province of León

United States
 Valverde, Denver, a neighborhood in the City and County of Denver, Colorado
 Valverde, New Mexico, a former Spanish settlement that gave its name to the nearby site of the Battle of Valverde during the American Civil War

See also 
 Green Valley (disambiguation)
 Val Verde (disambiguation)
 Verde (disambiguation)
 Val (disambiguation)